Woodman Peak is a summit in Mendocino County, California. It rises to an elevation of  two miles northeast of Laytonville, California.

References 

Mountains of Mendocino County, California